Ghulam Mohammad Mir was an Indian politician who served as a member of Lok Sabha, the lower-house of Indian Parliament. He represented the Srinagar constituency in the 11th Lok Sabha for 1996-1998 term. He was affiliated with the Indian National Congress. He has been described as "a Shia-leader from Budgam".

References

Indian Muslims
Kashmiri people
Lok Sabha members from Jammu and Kashmir
Indian National Congress politicians from Jammu and Kashmir
Living people
Year of birth missing (living people)
India MPs 1996–1997
Politicians from Srinagar